Menbi Gewog (Dzongkha: སྨན་སྦིས་) is one of eight gewogs (village block) of Lhuntse District, Bhutan located overlooking the fertile Tagmochhu valley.

References

Gewogs of Bhutan
Lhuntse District